Kathryn Elizabeth Cramer (born April 16, 1962) is an American science fiction writer,  editor, and literary critic.

Early years
Kathryn Cramer is the daughter of physicist John G. Cramer. She grew up in Seattle and graduated from Columbia University with degrees in mathematics and American studies.

Career
Cramer has worked for five literary agencies, most notably the Virginia Kidd Agency, and for several software companies, including consulting with Wolfram Research in the Scientific Information Group. She co-founded The New York Review of Science Fiction in 1988 with David G. Hartwell and others, and was its co-editor until 1991 and again since 1996. It has been nominated (as of 2007) for the Hugo Award for Best Semiprozine every year of its existence, fifteen times under her co-editorship.

Cramer was the hypertext fiction editor at Eastgate Systems in the early 1990s. She was part of the Global Connection Project, a joint project of Carnegie Mellon University, NASA, Google, and National Geographic using Google Earth and other tools following the 2005 Pakistan earthquake.<ref>Global Connection Project team; Ewalt, David M.: Google Is Everywhere, Forbes.com, September 2, 2005; Hafner, Katie: For Victims, News About Home Can Come From Strangers Online, The New York Times, September 5, 2006; Thompson, Bill: Net offers map help after the flood, BBC News, September 2, 2005</ref>

Cramer has written a number of essays published in the New York Review of Science Fiction. Book reviews for that journal include such works as This is the Way the World Ends by James Morrow, Ellipse of Uncertainty: An Introduction to Postmodern Fantasy by Lance Olsen, and Amnesia Moon by Jonathan Lethem. She is a contributor to the Encarta  article on science fiction and wrote the chapter on hard science fiction for the Cambridge Companion to Science Fiction ed. Farah Mendlesohn & Edward James. Several of her essays have been reprinted, for example "Science Fiction and the Adventures of the Spherical Cow" (NYRSF August 1988) in Visions of Wonder, ed. Milton T. Wolf & David G. Hartwell (Tor 1996).

Personal life
Cramer was married to David G. Hartwell from 1997 until his death in January 2016. She lives in Westport, New York, with their two children.

Bibliography

Anthologies
 The Architecture of Fear (1987) with Peter D. Pautz – winner of the World Fantasy Award for Best AnthologyMasterpieces of Fantasy and Enchantment (1988) with David G. HartwellSpirits of Christmas (1989) with David G. Hartwell, Tor Fantasy, .Masterpieces of Fantasy and Wonder (1989, GuildAmerica, ; 1994, St. Martin's Press) with David G. Hartwell
 Walls of Fear (1990), Avon Books,  – a World Fantasy Award nomineeThe Ascent of Wonder: The Evolution of Hard SF (1994) with David G. Hartwell, 
 The Hard SF Renaissance (2002) with David G. Hartwell, Orb books, 
 The Space Opera Renaissance (2006) with David G. Hartwell, Tor Books, 
 Hieroglyph: Stories and Visions for a Better Future (2014) with Ed Finn, William Morrow.

Anthology series

The Year's Best Fantasy is a fantasy anthology series edited by David G. Hartwell and Kathryn Cramer.
 Year's Best Fantasy 1 through 9 (2001–2009) with David G. Hartwell (HarperCollins 2001–2005, Tachyon Publications 2006–2007)

The Year's Best SF is a science fiction anthology series edited by David G. Hartwell and Kathryn Cramer. Hartwell started the series in 1996, and has been co-editing it with Cramer since 2002. It is published by HarperCollins under the Eos imprint. The creators of the books are not involved with the similarly titled Year's Best Science Fiction series.

 Year's Best SF 6  (2001)
 Year's Best SF 7  (2002)
 Year's Best SF 8  (2003)
 Year's Best SF 9  (2004)
 Year's Best SF 10  (2005)
 Year's Best SF 11  (2006)
 Year's Best SF 12  (2007)
 Year's Best SF 13  (2008) 
 Year's Best SF 14 (2009)
 Year's Best SF 15 (2010)
 Year's Best SF 16 (2011)
 Year's Best SF 17 (2012)

Short fiction
 "Forbidden Knowledge" in Mathenauts: Tales of Mathematical Wonder, ed. Rudy Rucker (1987).
 "Speaker for the Reticent", written with Greg Cox, in The New York Review of Science Fiction (December 1988).
 "The End of Everything" in Asimov's Science Fiction, Vol 14, No 10, Whole No 161 (October 1990), pp. 107–111.
 "In Small & Large Pieces" in The Eastgate Quarterly Review of Hypertext, Volume 1, No. 3, Eastgate Systems (1994). (a work of hypertext dark fantasy)
 "Disextinction" in Nature Magazine (2001).
 "Sandcastles: a Dystopia" in Nature Magazine (2005).
 "You, in Emulation" in Nature Magazine (October 20, 2011).
 "Am I Free to Go?" on Tor.com, 2012.

Poems

 "The Mourners" in Lady Churchill's Rosebud Wristlet, #11 (November 2002)
 "What Stopped Jack" in Lady Churchill's Rosebud Wristlet, #11 (November 2002)

Selected essays
 "Science Fiction and the Adventures of the Spherical Cow" in New York Review of Science Fiction (September 1988). Anthologized as: "Science Fiction & the Adventures of the Spherical Cow" in Visions of Wonder.
 "Democrazy, the Marketplace, and the American Way: Remarks on the Year 1990 in Science Fiction (Nebula Awards 26)" in Nebula Awards 26, ed. James Morrow (1992).
 "Science Fiction for What? Remarks on the Year 1991 (Nebula Awards 27)" in Nebula Awards 27, ed. James Morrow (1993).
 "Philip K. Dick: The Greatest Novels", co-authored with David Alexander Smith, David G. Hartwell, Paul Di Filippo, Alexander Jablokov, and Eric Van, in The New York Review of Science Fiction (June 1994). Transcribed from Panel 1, The First American Philip K. Dick Convention, September 25, 1993.
 How Shit Became Shinola: Definition and Redefinition of Space Opera with David G. Hartwell, SFRevu (August 2003).
 "Hard Science Fiction" in The Cambridge Companion to Science Fiction, ed. Edward James, Farah Mendlesohn (2006).

Interviews

 "Hypertext Horizon: An Interview With Kathryn Cramer" (ca. 1994) by Harry Goldstein (Transcript of a live on-line interview over Sonicnet)
 "Interview With Kathryn Cramer, Co-editor of Hieroglyph" by New Books Network (Podcast on New Books in Science Fiction and Fantasy) 

See also
 Hard science fiction
 Hypertext fiction
 Space opera
 The New York Review of Science Fiction''

References

External links
 
 
 Kathryn Cramer in the Index of Literary Nominees in the Locus Index to Science Fiction Awards

1962 births
20th-century American short story writers
21st-century American short story writers
American women bloggers
American bloggers
American speculative fiction critics
American speculative fiction editors
Columbia University School of General Studies alumni
Living people
Writers from Seattle
People from Pleasantville, New York
People from Westport, New York
Science fiction critics
Science fiction editors
Women science fiction and fantasy writers
World Fantasy Award winners
American women short story writers
Writers from Washington (state)
American women non-fiction writers
21st-century American non-fiction writers
Women speculative fiction editors
20th-century American women writers
21st-century American women writers